In mathematics, a corestriction of a function is a notion analogous to the notion of a restriction of a function. The duality prefix co- here denotes that while the restriction changes the domain to a subset, the corestriction changes the codomain to a subset. However, the notions are not categorically dual.

Given any subset  we can consider the corresponding inclusion of sets  as a function. Then for any function , the restriction  of a function  onto  can be defined as the composition .

Analogously, for an inclusion  the corestriction  of  onto  is the unique
function  such that there is a decomposition . More generally, one can consider corestriction of a morphism in general categories with images. The term is well known in category theory, while rarely used in print.

Andreotti introduces the above notion under the name coastriction, while the name corestriction reserves to the notion categorically dual to the notion of a restriction. Namely, if  is a surjection of sets (that is a quotient map) then Andreotti considers the composition , which surely always exists.

References

Set theory
Functions and mappings
Category theory
Hopf algebras
Abelian group theory
Mathematics articles needing expert attention